Vändra  is a village in Veriora Parish, Põlva County in southeastern Estonia.

References

 

Villages in Põlva County